"All Shook Up" is a song recorded by Elvis Presley, published by Elvis Presley Music, and composed by Otis Blackwell. The single topped the U.S. Billboard Top 100 on April 13, 1957, staying there for eight weeks. It also topped the Billboard R&B chart for four weeks, becoming Presley's second single to do so, and peaked at No. 1 on the country chart as well. It is certified 2× platinum by the Recording Industry Association of America.

It was ranked #352 on Rolling Stone'''s list of the 500 Greatest Songs of All Time.

History
Blackwell wrote the song at the offices of Shalimar Music in 1956 after Al Stanton, one of Shalimar's owners, shaking a bottle of Pepsi at the time, suggested he write a song based on the phrase "all shook up."

According to Peter Guralnick, the song has a different origin. In his book Last Train to Memphis, he wrote that Elvis thought "All Shook Up" was a good phrase for a refrain. For this he received a co-writing credit.

Elvis himself, during an interview on October 28, 1957, said: "I've never even had an idea for a song. Just once, maybe. I went to bed one night, had quite a dream, and woke up all shook up. I phoned a pal and told him about it. By morning, he had a new song, 'All Shook Up'."

Future Last House on the Left actor David Hess, using the stage name David Hill, was the first to record the song on Aladdin Records, titled "I'm All Shook Up". In a 2009 interview, Hess revealed the origins of the song, and claimed to come up with the title of the song: "As far as ‘All Shook Up’, the title came from a real set of circumstances and when I decided not to write it, Otis Blackwell did and I had the first recording for Aladdin Records. It was my title, but Otis wrote the song and Presley took a writing credit in order to get him to record it. That's the way things happened in those days."

Vicki Young recorded a different song with the same title, "(I'm) All Shook Up", on Capitol Records with Big Dave and His Orchestra, written by Bill Bellman and Hal Blaine in 1956.

On January 12, 1957, Presley recorded the song at Radio Recorders in Hollywood. The duet vocal on the record is by The Jordanaires first tenor Gordon Stoker. Take 10 was selected for release, and in March the song entered Billboards Top 100 chart at #25. Within three weeks it had knocked Perry Como's "Round and Round" off the top spot, and stayed there for eight consecutive weeks. The song also became Presley's first No. 1 hit on the UK Singles Chart, remaining there for seven weeks. Sales of the single exceeded two million, and the song was named Billboards Year End number one song for 1957.

PersonnelThe Blue Moon Boys Elvis Presley – lead vocals, percussion
 Scotty Moore – lead guitar
 Bill Black – string bass
 D. J. Fontana – drumsThe Jordanaires' Gordon Stoker – harmony and backing vocals
 Hoyt Hawkins – backing vocals, piano
 Neal Matthews, Hugh Jarrett – backing vocals

Charts

Certifications

 Beatles versions 
According to biographer Mark Lewisohn in The Complete Beatles Chronicle, The Beatles (first as The Quarrymen) regularly performed the song, from 1957 through 1960 (possibly later) with Paul McCartney on lead vocal. There is no known recorded version from that time. However, Len Garry of The Quarrymen (in his book John, Paul & Me) states that it was one of the songs the group played on July 6, 1957, the day John Lennon met Paul McCartney and that the song was recorded then (but was erased later). Author Doug Sulpy (in Drugs, Divorce and a Slipping Image) adds that on January 13, 1969, during the massive "Get Back" sessions, they did record a "spirited" version of it with McCartney and George Harrison sharing vocals. Lennon did not join in the recording, as he was sitting watching while having tea. That version of the song remains officially unreleased (due to it being in mono and McCartney and Harrison not remembering all the lyrics by that late date). In 1999, McCartney cut a hard-rocking version on the album Run Devil Run, while his surviving Quarrymen bandmates recorded it in 2004 on Songs We Remember.

Billy Joel version

In 1991, Billy Joel recorded the song for the movie Honeymoon in Vegas, which also featured other Elvis Presley songs by various artists. It was released as a single and peaked at No. 92 in the US and No. 27 in the UK.

Chart positions

Other recordings and notable performances
 Suzi Quatro recorded the song for her debut solo album Suzi Quatro in 1973. (The title of this album in Australia is Can the Can). Her recording of the song was released as a single in 1974 and peaked at number 85 on the Billboard Hot 100. Presley invited Quatro to Graceland, commenting that her version was the best since the original. Quatro declined the offer.

Derivatives and parodies
Jim Jacobs and Warren Casey included a strongly derivative piece, "All Choked Up", as part of the original version of the musical Grease. The song was included in the Broadway version; in 1978, when the musical was adapted as a feature film of the same name, "All Choked Up" was not included, and a new song, "You're the One That I Want" (which bore no musical resemblance to "All Shook Up"), was used instead and went on to become a major hit.

Filipino comedians Joey de Leon and Vic Sotto parodied Elvis Presley's “All Shook Up”. A full version of the theme song was released as a single by Tito, Vic & Joey in 1979 and featured in the trio's Sgt. Pepe (Tito, Vic & Joey, Vol. IV) album.

See also
 List of Billboard number-one singles of 1957
 List of Billboard number-one rhythm and blues hits
 Billboard year-end top 50 singles of 1957
 List of Cash Box Best Sellers number-one singles of 1957
 List of CHUM number-one singles of 1957
 Preseucoela imallshookupis''

References

Billy Joel songs
Elvis Presley songs
Suzi Quatro songs
1957 singles
1974 singles
1992 singles
Billboard Top 100 number-one singles
UK Singles Chart number-one singles
Songs written by Otis Blackwell
Songs written by Elvis Presley
RCA Victor singles
Epic Records singles
1957 songs